The .378 Weatherby Magnum was designed by Roy Weatherby in 1953. It was an original belted magnum design with no parent case, inspired by the .416 Rigby and headspacing of the belted .375 H&H Magnum. The 215 magnum rifle primer was developed by Federal specifically for this round. The cartridge can hold upwards of 7.13 g (120 gr) of powder. The 378 Weatherby Magnum cartridge also has the double radius shoulder design found on the first and smaller proprietary line of Weatherby magnum cartridges.

The motivation behind the development of the .378 came from the disappointing performance gains of the improved .375 Weatherby Magnum over its parent case, the .375 H&H Magnum. Roy Weatherby in 1953 killed an African elephant with one shot while on safari. However, in using this event as a marketing tool, it was revealed some African countries have a minimum 10.16 mm (.40 caliber) bullet size for hunting dangerous game. Weatherby responded by necking up the .378 to 11.63 mm (.458 caliber) and called the new cartridge the .460 Weatherby Magnum, which was introduced in 1958.

Considered a safari-grade cartridge, the .378 Weatherby Magnum is appropriate for taking all African game animals from large African antelopes, Nile crocodile, hippopotamus, to the Big Five game. Some hunters on the North American continent employ the .378 for American elk, brown bears, and polar bear.

The .378 Weatherby will generate considerable free recoil, an average of 104 J (77 ft·lbf) from a 4.1 kg (9 lb) rifle. This compares to 27 J (20 ft·lbf) from a rifle chambered for .30-06 Springfield or 49 J (36 ft·lbf) for the .375 H&H Magnum.

The .378 has been responsible for numerous wildcat cartridges, being necked-down as the .22 Eargesplitten Loudenboomer and necked-up as the .500 A-Square. Some of the .378 Weatherby Magnum wildcat cartridges are shortened versions, like the .30-378 Arch (7.62 mm) and the .460 Short A-Square (11.63 mm). Some .378-based wildcats have gone on to be part of the Weatherby line: .30-378, .338-378, .416 and .460.

See also
 List of rifle cartridges
 9 mm caliber other cartridges in the same caliber range.
.22 Eargesplitten Loudenboomer wildcat cartridges based on .378 Weatherby Magnum.
30-378 weatherby magnum 
338-378 weatherby magnum

Footnotes

Pistol and rifle cartridges
Magnum rifle cartridges
Weatherby Magnum rifle cartridges